Abdul Matin Chowdhury (1915 – 19 February 1990), popularly known as Shaikh-e-Fulbari, was a Bengali religious scholar and political activist. A disciple of Hussain Ahmed Madani, he later gained his own following and was politically involved during the partition of India and independence of Bangladesh.

Early life and background
Abdul Matin Chowdhury was born in 1915 to a Zamindar family in the village of Fulbari, Golapganj, in what is now Sylhet District, Bangladesh. He was the youngest of the six children of his parents, Rizwan Uddin and Khair-un-nessa Chowdhury. Through his father, he claimed descent from Abdullah ibn Ja'far, a nephew of the fourth Rashidun caliph, Ali ibn Abi Talib. Chowdhury's lineage is the following: Abdul Matin Chowdhury, son of Rizwan Uddin Chowdhury, son of Haydar Ali, son of Muhammad Abdul Latif, son of Muhammad Nazim, son of Muhammad Jama, son of Tahir Muhammad, son of Muhammad Danish, son of Ahmad Khan, son of Karim Khan, son of Mumin Khan, son of Dua Khan, son of Qalandar Hazara, son of Bolly Hazara, son of Mir Hazara. It is said that the latter was granted jagirs in Fulbari by the Mughals after migrating from Afghanistan and marrying the daughter of the Amil (administrator) of Gaur.

After being orphaned at the age of eight, Chowdhury initially lived with his elder sister, before coming under the care of his maternal uncle in the village of Ronokali. In 1928, he was introduced to Hussain Ahmed Madani, who had been familiar with his late father. Having impressed Madani with his religious piety and enthusiasm, Chowdhury returned with him to Uttar Pradesh, where he became enrolled at Darul Uloom Deoband, a prominent Islamic university. During this time, he developed a close relationship with Madani, whose home he stayed at during his education, later becoming his religious disciple. Chowdhury graduated from the university after nine years, having had proven a competency in Hadiths, Tafsir and Arabic literature among others.

Political and religious career
Under Madani's instructions, he took part and became a leader in the Indian independence movement. Following the Partition of India in 1947, Chowdhury supported the development of the newly created Pakistan, working alongside the leadership of the Jamiat Ulema-e-Hind organisation. After Bangladesh declared independence in 1971, he attempted to prevent incidents of violence against people by the Pakistani military. When fifty of his relatives in Ronokali were cornered by the army, Chowdhury successfully appealed to the soldiers to spare them. On another occasion, he was able to intervene to save the lives of seven Hindus under similar circumstances. Chowdhury subsequently played an active part in the Bangladesh Khilafat movement, working under the leadership of Hafezzi Huzur and presiding over many of its conferences.

In 1966 and 1967, Chowdhury undertook extensive missionary work as part of the Tablighi Jamaat organisation. His travels included Turkey, the United Kingdom, Yugoslavia, Iran, Saudi Arabia and Japan. He became a notable orator, performing lectures in Bengali, Urdu, Arabic and English. Chowdhury was further recognised both as a philanthropist, due to his support of the poor, and as a writer, receiving praise for his publication, Shatter Mapkati (Scale of Truth). He eventually built up an extensive religious following, with his disciples and pupils including Emdadul Haque, Nur Uddin Gohorpuri and Amin Uddin Shaikh-e-Ketia.

Death and legacy
Chowdhury died on 19 February 1990 and was survived by his wife and seven children. His burial in his family's ancestral cemetery at Fulbari was attended by thousands of his followers, with the funeral prayer having been led by Gohorpuri. The Allama Abdul Motin Chowdhury Shaikh-e-Fulbari Foundation was later established in his honour by several former disciples.

See also
Ajiria Madrasa

Notes

References

External links

1915 births
1990 deaths
People from Golapganj Upazila
Bangladeshi Sunni Muslim scholars of Islam
Indian independence activists
20th-century Bengalis
Darul Uloom Deoband alumni
Deobandis
Bengali Muslim scholars of Islam